John Aloysius Collins (4 October 1904 – 25 July 1968) was an Australian rules footballer who played for the Melbourne Football Club in the Victorian Football League (VFL).

Collins, who was originally from CBC St Kilda, was on a wing for Melbourne in their 1926 premiership team. He represented Victoria B against New South Wales in 1929. His sons, Geoff and Mike, both played for Melbourne.

References

External links

1904 births
Australian rules footballers from Melbourne
Melbourne Football Club players
1968 deaths
Melbourne Football Club Premiership players
One-time VFL/AFL Premiership players
People from Murrumbeena, Victoria